USCGC Point Doran (WPB-82375) was a  cutter built in 1970 and operated by the United States Coast Guard. She was later transferred to the Philippines as BRP Abraham Campo (PC-396). The ship was named after a location in the Chugach Mountains.

Construction and career 
Point Doran was built at the Coast Guard Yard, in Baltimore, Maryland in 1970. She was commissioned on 1 June 1970 and was stationed at Everett, Washington. She was used for law enforcement and search and rescue operations primarily in the waters of Puget Sound.

Service in the United States Coast Guard 
During the Vietnam War, she patrolled the Hood Canal to prevent protestors from entering Naval Submarine Base Bangor and Naval Station Bremerton.

On 23 November 1987, at 03:15, Coast Guard Group Seattle received a report that a sailing vessel was on fire south of Cypress Island.  Star Fire, a vessel in the vicinity, picked up two people from their life raft as Point Doran put out the fire and dewatered the vessel. She then embarked the two survivors and towed the vessel to Cape Sante Marina, Anacortes.

Point Doran was the lead boat during the Seattle Yacht Club Opening Day Parade, on 4 August 1989. Later on 6 November, an US Navy Grumman A-6 Intruder ditched into the sea off Whidbey Island. Point Doran was dispatched and retrieved parts of the aircraft.

She was decommissioned on 2 March 2001 at Pier 36, and was then donated to the Philippines on the 6th.

Service in the Philippine Navy 
On 22 March 2001, the boat was commissioned as BRP Abraham Campo (PC-396).

In December 2020, she participated in the 85th Anniversary Fleet Review in Morong, Bataan.

On 24 November 2021, the ship conducted a live-firing exercise in the Camotes Sea. The Philippine Navy deployed 19 warships including Abraham Campo for humanitarian aid in Typhoon Odette stricken areas.

References

United States Coast Guard: Point Doran, 1970

External links 
TogetherWeServed: Point Doran Crew Members

Point-class cutters
1970 ships
Ships built in Baltimore
Point-class cutters of the Philippine Navy